Clachnaben (archaically "Cloch-na'bain"; Scottish Gaelic: "Clach na Beinne") is a 589-metre hill in Glen Dye, Aberdeenshire, Scotland. It is a distinctive hill visible from many points on Lower Deeside and is topped with a large granite tor. Clachnaben is the war cry of Clan Strachan. The hill gives its name to one of the houses at Aboyne Academy.

Geography
A popular walk starts at the car park on the Cairn O' Mounth (Banchory–Fettercairn) road, 10 kilometres south of Banchory. Popularity has caused some erosion on the old steep path which climbs this hill directly; however, efforts have been made to stabilise the erosion. A new improved path takes an easier and less direct route from Millar's Bog to the summit. There are views to Mount Battock, Lochnagar and Bennachie.

The granite tor provides some rock climbing.  An annual fell race is run on the hill.

Gallery

References

External links
 Clach na Beinn Climbing Topo

Mountains and hills of the Eastern Highlands
Mountains and hills of Aberdeenshire